The 2017 Pac-12 Conference men's soccer season was the 18th season of men's varsity soccer in the conference.

Stanford, who entered the season as the three-time defending Pac-12 champions, successfully defended their title for the fourth consecutive season, by winning the regular season (there is no conference tournament). The Cardinal were also the two-time defending NCAA champions, and successfully defended their title. California and Washington earned at-large berths into the 2017 NCAA Division I Men's Soccer Tournament, but were both eliminated in the first round.

Stanford's Foster Langsdorf, won the Pac-12 Conference Men's Soccer Player of the Year

Teams

Stadiums and locations 

 Arizona, Arizona State, Colorado, Oregon, USC, Utah and Washington State do not sponsor men's soccer. San Diego State is an associated member.

Preseason

Recruiting

Preseason poll 
The preseason poll was released on August 15, 2017.

Head coaches

Regular season 

All times Pacific time.

Week 1 (Aug 21-27) 
Schedule and results:

Players of the week:

Week 2 (Aug 28-Sep 3) 
Schedule and results:

Players of the week:

Week 3 (Sep 4-10) 
Schedule and results:

Players of the week:

Week 4 (Sep 11-17) 
Schedule and results:

Players of the week:

Week 5 (Sep 18-24) 
Schedule and results:

Players of the week:

Week 6 (Sep 25-Oct 1) 
Schedule and results:

Players of the week:

Week 7 (Oct 2-8) 
Schedule and results:

Players of the week:

Week 8 (Oct 9-15) 
Schedule and results:

Players of the week:

Week 9 (Oct 16-22) 
Schedule and results:

Players of the week:

Week 10 (Oct 23-29) 
Schedule and results:

Players of the week:

Week 11 (Oct 30-Nov 5) 
Schedule and results:

Players of the week:

Week 12 (Nov 6-Nov 12) 
Schedule and results:

Players of the week:

Rankings

United Soccer Coaches National

United Soccer Coaches Far West Regional

Postseason

NCAA tournament

All-Pac-12 awards and teams

MLS SuperDraft

Draft picks 
A total of seven players were drafted in the 2018 MLS SuperDraft.

Homegrown contracts

See also 
 2017 NCAA Division I men's soccer season

References 

 
2017 NCAA Division I men's soccer season